William Shaner (born April 25, 2001, in Colorado Springs, Colorado) is an American sports shooter. He has competed in national and international competitions, most notably he won the gold medal in the men's 10 metre air rifle event at the 2020 Summer Olympics, the gold medal in the 10m air rifle event at the  2021 ISSF World Cup Croatia, the gold medal in the 10m air rifle event at the 2021 ISSF Junior World Championship Lima, and the bronze medal in the 50 m rifle prone event at the 2018 World Championships. Shaner also was part of the University of Kentucky rifle team that won the 2021 NCAA Rifle Championships.

References

External links
 

2001 births
Living people
American male sport shooters
Olympic shooters of the United States
Olympic gold medalists for the United States in shooting
Olympic medalists in shooting
Shooters at the 2020 Summer Olympics
Medalists at the 2020 Summer Olympics
ISSF rifle shooters
Kentucky Wildcats rifle shooters
Sportspeople from Colorado Springs, Colorado